Plasmodium anasum is a species of the genus Plasmodium subgenus Giovannolaia.

Like all species in this genus it has both vertebrate and insect hosts. The vertebrate host are birds.

Taxonomy 

This species was described in 1965 by Manwell and Kuntz.

References 

anasum
Parasites of birds